The Gothenburg quadricentennial jubilee was originally scheduled to be held in Gothenburg, Sweden, in 2021 to celebrate the 400th anniversary of the city. Due to the ongoing COVID-19 pandemic in Sweden, organizers have postponed the celebrations to 2023, while a small-scale event will still take place in 2021. The anniversary follows the city's tricentennial jubilee held in 1923 (which was intended to be held in 1921, but was delayed due to World War I).

The city was granted its founding royal charter in 1621, by King Gustavus Adolphus.

Themes
The executive committee appointed to plan the celebrations is focusing on seven themes:

Green Town
City of Culture
Knowledge City
Young Town
Experience The City
Growing Town
Open Town

Ongoing projects
The work of several existing projects is being integrated into the overall jubilee project:
Bergsjön 2021
BoStad2021
Campus Näckrosen, University of Gothenburg
Älvstaden, including the New Göta Älvbron
A borderless West Sweden
Cultural institution's role
Mistra Urban Futures
Red Stone Konsthall
Sustainable Gothenburg
Wake Gothenburg
Developing the North East
Vision Angered
West Swedish package
A more sustainable transport system
Marieholm Tunnel
New Götaälvbro
Congestion charges
Developed public transport
West Link

See also
Gothenburg Exhibition (1923)

References

External links
Official website

2021 in Sweden
2023 in Sweden
Anniversaries
Scheduled events
Cultural assimilation
Culture in Gothenburg
Environmentalism in Sweden
Events in Gothenburg
Events postponed due to the COVID-19 pandemic
Festivals in Sweden
Observances in Sweden
Science and technology in Sweden
Urban planning in Sweden
Tourist attractions in Gothenburg
Sustainable urban planning